Raymond Joseph Dobens (July 28, 1906 – April 21, 1980) was an American pitcher in Major League Baseball who played briefly for the Boston Red Sox during the  season. He was born in Nashua, New Hampshire, and attended the College of the Holy Cross, where he played baseball. The college's Varsity Club annually presents the Ray Dobens Award to its "most improved player."

During his MLB trial, he recorded a 3.81 ERA with four strikeouts and 28⅓ innings of work in 11 appearances, two as a starter. He did not have a decision. The 1929 Red Sox finished eighth and last in the American League with a 58–96 record.

Dobens' professional career lasted three seasons. He died in Stuart, Florida, at the age of 73.

See also
Boston Red Sox all-time roster

References

External links

1906 births
1980 deaths
Baseball players from New Hampshire
Boston Red Sox players
College of the Holy Cross alumni
Denver Bears players
Holy Cross Crusaders baseball players
Major League Baseball pitchers
New Haven Bulldogs players
Norfolk Tars players
Pittsfield Hillies players
Sportspeople from Nashua, New Hampshire